Fort/Cass station is a Detroit People Mover station in Downtown Detroit, Michigan.  It is located at the intersection of Fort Street and Cass Avenue. It serves nearby media sources, including newspaper publishers Detroit Free Press, Detroit News and television station WDIV-TV channel 4.

The People Mover shut down temporarily on March 30, 2020, due to decreased ridership amid the COVID-19 pandemic. Following the system's May 2022 restart, the station reopened on September 14, 2022.

See also

 List of rapid transit systems
 List of United States rapid transit systems by ridership
 Metromover
 Transportation in metropolitan Detroit

References

External links
 DPM station overview
Cass Avenue entrance from Google Maps Street View

Downtown Detroit
Railway stations in the United States opened in 1987
1987 establishments in Michigan